Horacio Allegue Lamas (born 7 March 1972) is a Spanish rower. He competed in the men's eight event at the 1992 Summer Olympics.

References

1972 births
Living people
Spanish male rowers
Olympic rowers of Spain
Rowers at the 1992 Summer Olympics
People from Ferrol (comarca)
Sportspeople from the Province of A Coruña